This is a list of active Italian Navy ships. The navy maintains approximately 181 ships in service, including minor auxiliary vessels. The fleet has started a process of renewal that will see 50 ships retired by 2025 and replaced by 30 multi-mission ships. Ocean going fleet units include: 2 light aircraft carriers, 3 small 8,000-tonne amphibious transport docks, 4 air-defence destroyers, 4 general-purpose frigates, 7 anti-submarine frigates, and 8 attack submarines. Patrol and littoral warfare units include 2 light patrol frigate, 10 offshore patrol vessels and two corvettes. In support of the fleet there are 10 mine countermeasure vessels, 6 coastal patrol boats/special forces patrol boats and a various auxiliary ships. The total displacement of the Italian Navy is approximately 275,000 tonnes.

Submarine fleet

Surface fleet

Aircraft carriers

Amphibious warfare

Major surface combatants

Patrol

Mine countermeasures

Auxiliary fleet
The Italian Navy keeps in service a number of auxiliary and support ships. These include:

Replenishment ships

Submarine support and rescue ship

Electronic support ship

Hydrographic survey vessels

Research and multi-purpose support ships

Water tanker ships

Coastal tanker ships

Coastal transport ships

Logistic tender ships

Landing craft

Deep sea tugboats

Coastal tugboats

Harbour tugboats

Harbour water and oil tanker ships

Ferry-boat

Sail training tall ships

Sail training vessel

Sailing boat cruise

Floating docks

See also
 List of decommissioned ships of the Italian Navy

Other maritime organisations of Italy:
 List of Guardia di Finanza vessels
 List of Italian Coast Guard vessels

References

External links
  Italian Navy ships (marina.difesa.it)
  Italian Navy submarines (marina.difesa.it)
  Italian Navy aircraft (marina.difesa.it)
  Italian Navy new projects (marina.difesa.it)

Navy ships
Italian Navy ships
 
Italy